"Set Me Free" is the debut single by Velvet Revolver, released in 2003. It was released as the lead single from their debut album Contraband. It also appeared in the 2003 Marvel Comics film Hulk.

Alternative versions
The album version features different mixing and also contains a slightly different ending, with a drum beat no longer finishing the song.

A live version is also included on the "Slither" single. This version includes an extended guitar solo at the end of the song.

Song Structure

The song's main riff was created by the band's guitarist, Slash. The song then goes through two rotations of verse-chorus, then a bridge and a fairly complicated guitar solo by Slash. The song then finishes with another chorus and guitar solo.

Music video

The music video, directed by Dean Karr, shows the band playing at a club live, which was the first gig where the Velvet Revolver idea was formed. It also shows some scenes from the Hulk movie.

Track listing

Chart performance

References

External links
Music video

Velvet Revolver songs
2003 debut singles
Songs written by Slash (musician)
Songs written by Matt Sorum
Songs written by Duff McKagan
Songs written by Scott Weiland
2003 songs
Songs written by Dave Kushner
Song recordings produced by Nick Raskulinecz
RCA Records singles
Hulk (film)